New Amsterdam is the regional capital of East Berbice-Corentyne, Guyana and one of the country's largest towns. New Amsterdam's population is 17,329 inhabitants as of 2012.

History

New Amsterdam has its origins in a village which grew up alongside Fort Nassau in the 1730s and 1740s. The first Nieuw Amsterdam, as it was called then, was situated about  up the Berbice River on the right bank. Before the 1763 slave uprising it comprised a Court of Policy building, a warehouse, an inn, two smithies, a bakery, a Lutheran church and a number of houses, among other buildings. Built in 1740 by the Dutch, New Amsterdam was first named Fort Sint Andries. It was made seat of the Dutch colonial government in 1790. In 1803 it was taken over by the British.

The little township was a pioneer in several by-laws; it boasted the first sanitation regulations on record (no privies near the public path, drains to be dug and places kept weeded) and the first price controls in the only hostelry in town as well as alcoholic beverages, including madeira, jenever, kilthum (the forerunner of rum) and even a drink made by the Amerindians. Of course, alcohol was not considered an indulgence in those days, but rather a necessity, since it was erroneously believed that it warded off diseases like malaria, which it was claimed came from exposure to 'miasmas'.

In March 1763, the rebel leader Cuffy made the Court of Policy building in the little town his headquarters, and on either side of its doorway he placed two cannon, which had been repaired for him by the blacksmith Prins. When the revolutionaries were forced to retreat upriver in 1764, New Amsterdam was torched under the supervision of Prins, and only the brick Lutheran church survived. After the uprising was crushed, he was charged with arson and executed.

While the village was rebuilt afterwards, by the 1770s it was already becoming apparent that it had ceased to be the centre of the colony. The planters had begun to move to the more fertile soils of the lower river, leaving the township somewhat isolated upstream. At first the Dutch authorities had some grandiose plans to construct imposing government buildings there - plans which can still be seen in the State Archives in The Hague. However, eventually they had to recognize that such development would be futile in a context where Berbice's economic activity was centred on the lower river, and in 1785 they took a decision to relocate the town to the mouth of the Canje.

By June 1790, the authorities were ready for private residents, and in January of the following year they published an ordinance laying down the conditions for the granting of house lots in the present New Amsterdam. Each resident had to empolder his land and dig drainage ditches, and anyone who had not built a house within six months of the government being transferred from upstream, was to lose his lot.

Five years later, Berbice's capital fell into British hands, although not all its early visitors from that quarter of Europe were impressed by its appearance. Gradually, however, it acquired a character of its own, and to its credit it still boasts (among many other advantages) what is arguably the best example of Cesar Castellani's architecture extant, namely, the New Amsterdam Public Hospital (The Palms in Georgetown is another example of his work).

In 1831, New Amsterdam lost its status as a capital, when the two colonies of Berbice and Essequibo/Demerara were combined into one to become British Guiana.

The present town is fairly small, consisting of three main roads with about a dozen cross streets. It has a mayor, Kirt Wynter, and a thriving market.

Points of interest
New Amsterdam serves as a port and has a government-run hospital. The town has many old colonial buildings, some dating back to the time of Dutch colonisation. Mission Chapel has been designated a National Heritage Site.

The main schools in New Amsterdam are Berbice High School, Berbice Educational Institute, Vryman's Erven Secondary, Tutorial Academy, and New Amsterdam Secondary formerly known as New Amsterdam Multilateral High School (opened in 1975).

The Esplanade is the name of an open public ground west of Esplanade Road and immediately opposite The Gardens. It was a picnic resort and rendezvous for the people of Berbice. The bandstand featured the British Guiana Militia Band.

Travel
There are several hotels in the town, including Church View Guest House, Astor Hotel, Little Rock Hotel, Leisure Inn Hotel, The Penguin International Hotel, and the Parkway Hotel. The newly built Little Rock Suites on Main Street (Not to be confused with Little Rock Hotel in Vryman's Erven).

In December 2008, travel to New Amsterdam was made easier by the opening of the Berbice Bridge providing a direct connection to Georgetown.

Notable people 
 David Dabydeen (b. 1955), novelist, poet and academic
 Jocelyn Dow (b. 1951), human rights activist and entrepreneur
 Carl Barrington Greenidge (b. 1949), former Vice-President
 Edward Luckhoo (1912–1998), Governor General and former acting President
 Lionel Luckhoo (1914–1997), lawyer and politician
 Edgar Mittelholzer (1909–1965), novelist
 Shridath Ramphal (b. 1928), former Commonwealth Secretary-General

Utilities 

New Amsterdam has three television stations: DTV-8, located in the heart of the town, Little Rock Television Station (LRTVS) Channel 10 located in Vryman's Erven, TVG located in St. Ann Street. LRTVS was the first television station in Berbice. The first radio station broadcasting from New Amsterdam was also launched in 2014 by Little Rock and broadcasts on FM 88.5 MHz.

Climate
New Amsterdam has a tropical rainforest climate (Af) with heavy rainfall year-round.

Sister cities 
  – Midland, Texas (United States)

References

Bibliography 

 
 
 

 
Populated places in East Berbice-Corentyne
History of Guyana
Populated places established in the 1630s